Andrew Haydon may refer to:
Andrew Haydon (senator) (1867–1932), member of the Senate of Canada
Andrew S. Haydon (fl. 1970s–1990s), politician in the Regional Municipality of Ottawa-Carleton

See also
Andrew Hayden-Smith (born 1983), actor